The Freehold Stakes was an American Thoroughbred horse race run annually in early August at the Monmouth Park Association's racetrack in Long Branch, New Jersey. Inaugurated in 1879, the Champion Stakes was open to horses of any age and was raced on dirt over a distance of one and one half miles (12 furlongs).

In 1891, the races at Long Branch had to be shifted to racetracks in New York when government legislation attempted to inhibit parimutuel wagering. The races were split between the Jerome Park Racetrack  in Fordham, Bronx and at the nearby Morris Park Racecourse at Westchester Village. The Monmouth Park Racing Association closed and the land sold after its operating license was revoked in 1893 and government legislation was enacted that banned parimutuel wagering.

Records
Speed record:
 2:33.25 - Firenze (1890)

Most wins:
 3 - Firenze (1888, 1889, 1890)

Most wins by a jockey:
 3 - William Donohue (1882, 1883, 1884)

Most wins by a trainer:
 3 - Evert V. Snedecker (1882, 1883, 1884)
 3 - Matthew Byrnes (1888, 1889, 1890)
 3 - John Huggins (1886, 1887, 1892)

Most wins by an owner:
 3 - James Ben Ali Haggin (1888, 1889, 1890)

Winners

*  † In 1892, Banquet won but was disqualified for interference and set back to last.

Notes

References
 August 4, 1882 New York Times article on the Freehold Stakes
 July 30, 1884 New York Times article on Eole's second win in the Freehold Stakes
 August 6, 1891 New York Times article on Firenze's three straight wins in the Freehold Stakes

Horse races in the United States
Open middle distance horse races
Discontinued horse races
Monmouth Park Racetrack
Recurring sporting events established in 1882
1882 establishments in New Jersey